Bouch is a surname. Notable people with the surname include:

A. Bouch, New Zealand cricketer
Allan Bouch (1903–1997), Australian rules footballer 
Herbert Bouch (1868–1929), British cricketer
Ralph Bouch (1932–2016), American football and wrestling coach
Thomas Bouch (1822–1880), British railway engineer
William Bouch (1813–1876), British railway engineer